Oliver Blake (October 1, 1802 – December 10, 1873) was an Ontario businessman and political figure. He was a Liberal member of the Senate of Canada from 1867 to 1873.

He was born in New Hampton, New Hampshire, United States in 1802 and came to Upper Canada while young. As a young man he sold fanning mills. Later, he was a director of the Beaver Mutual Fire Insurance Company. He was appointed court clerk in 1841; Deputy Reeve of Townsend Township in Norfolk County, Councillor of Townsend Township in 1853, and served as Reeve of Townsend Township in 1852, 1854 - 1857. Blake was elected to the Legislative Council of the Province of Canada for Thames division in 1862 and was named to the Senate after Confederation.

References
 
 The Canadian parliamentary companion, HJ Morgan (1871)
  Archives of Ontario. Registrations of Deaths, 1869–1934. Roll: MS935_7. Archives of Ontario, Toronto, Ontario, Canada
 
 "Reminiscences of John Carrow, Esq." a Paper read to the Norfolk Historical Society by H. Frank Cook and subsequently published in 4 Dec 1902 Simcoe Reformer (page 1)

1802 births
1873 deaths
Members of the Legislative Council of the Province of Canada
Canadian senators from Ontario
Liberal Party of Canada senators
American emigrants to pre-Confederation Ontario
Immigrants to Upper Canada
People from New Hampton, New Hampshire